Marian Bíreš (born 27 July 1964 in Banská Bystrica) is a retired Slovak alpine skier who competed for Czechoslovakia in the 1992 Winter Olympics.

External links
 sports-reference.com

1964 births
Living people
Slovak male alpine skiers
Olympic alpine skiers of Czechoslovakia
Czechoslovak male alpine skiers
Alpine skiers at the 1992 Winter Olympics
Universiade medalists in alpine skiing
Sportspeople from Banská Bystrica
Universiade gold medalists for Czechoslovakia
Competitors at the 1989 Winter Universiade